Old Shop is a local service district and designated place in the Canadian province of Newfoundland and Labrador. It is on the western side of the Dildo Arm, at the southern end of Trinity Bay. It is northwest of South Dildo, across the Dildo Arm from Dildo proper.

History 
Old Shop was first used as a centre for cutting ships' timber and was simply called "The Old Chop" by those that worked there. Local tradition states the name comes from mistranslation of "Old Chop" and happened when the town was first settled for permanent living.

Geography 
Old Shop is in Newfoundland within Subdivision Y of Division No. 1.

Demographics 

Government 
Old Shop is a local service district (LSD) that is governed by a committee responsible for the provision of certain services to the community. The chair of the LSD committee is Jeffrey Garland.

See also 
List of communities in Newfoundland and Labrador
List of designated places in Newfoundland and Labrador
List of local service districts in Newfoundland and Labrador

References 

Populated coastal places in Canada
Designated places in Newfoundland and Labrador
Local service districts in Newfoundland and Labrador